is a football club team based in Hirosaki, Aomori. They currently play in Tohoku Soccer League, which part of Japanese Regional Leagues. It was founded in 2012 and aims to be a future J. League member.

History
Founded in 2012, the name is formed by the mix of "white" in French ("blanc") and the name of Shirakami-Sanchi mountains.

Current squad
Updated to 13 January 2023.

League and cup record
Updated to 2022 season 

Key

Stadium

References

External links
 Official website  
   
   
   
 Tohoku Soccer League – Blancdieu Hirosaki team information  

Football clubs in Japan
Sports teams in Aomori Prefecture
Hirosaki